4/73 (Sphinx) Special Observation Post Battery Royal Artillery is a surveillance and target acquisition unit of the British Army. It is part of 5th Regiment Royal Artillery and is based at Catterick Garrison in North Yorkshire.

Organisation
4/73 Battery comprises a Battery Headquarters and four Patrols Troops. It has a strength of six officers and 58 other ranks. Three troops, each consisting of a three-man headquarters and two six-man patrols, provide support to the brigades of 3rd (United Kingdom) Division and others. One troop of a three-man headquarters and one six-man patrol at high readiness to support 16 Air Assault Brigade Combat Team.

Role
Special Observers give commanders the ability to deploy a specialist force element at range, in proximity to the enemy and in all weathers, to locate and prosecute targets as required. Working as the intelligence, surveillance, target acquisition, and reconnaissance (ISTAR) asset in each of the brigades, the STA Patrols Troop are subject matter experts on Static Covert Surveillance (SCS) and complement the reconnaissance activity conducted by other Ground Manned Reconnaissance (GMR) forces in the Brigade.

The skill set includes:
 manned observation post (OPs)
 real time transmission of information
 comprehensive technical surveillance, through use of: long lens optics, cameras and data transfer systems, to provide imagery of evidential quality
 deployment of Long Range Electro Optical (LREO) systems: covert remote cameras and sensors
 initiation of the full spectrum of joint fires
 conduct of battle damage assessment (BDA)
 trained in Survive, Evade, Resist, Extract (SERE)

Insignia
Whilst most gunners wear a dark blue beret, since 2008 soldiers of 4/73 Battery have worn a khaki beret to mark the close working relationship of the battery with the Honourable Artillery Company (HAC). Soldiers that have passed the Surveillance Reconnaissance Patrol selection course also wear the Special Observers badge in perpetuity on their arm in all orders of dress.

History

In early 1970s, I Corps General Support Artillery Regiment was based in the foothills of the Harz in the town of Hildesheim close to the inner German border. This included 5 Regiment RA whose role as part of the NATO General Development Plan (GDP) in the event of war, was to contribute to imposing delay on the advancing Warsaw Pact forces. Operating deep inside enemy territory, however, required specialist training at that time only undertaken by the Corps Patrol Unit, consisting of 21 SAS(R), 23 SAS(R) and the HAC.

By 1980, the Commanding Officer of 5th Regiment Royal Artillery, Lt Colonel A C P Stone, prepared a detailed paper setting out the case that the Regiment required special observation post soldiers. This new unit would dig underground shelters close to the inner German border and allow the advancing enemy forces to pass by them. Following this, two pairs of Gunners would emerge from each underground patrol shelter to direct the fire from the Regiment's artillery. 
Thus, in 1982, the Special Observation Post Troop was founded to take on that role as part of 5th Regiment Royal Artillery (RA). The unit was stationed in Hildesheim, close to the IGB. From 1985 onward, two Special OP Troops would have guided the artillery fire of their respective parent units (5th and 32 Reg RA) from their underground shelters on the IGB.
In 1989, Captain D B Jones, suggested to his Commanding Officer, that there should only be one Special observation post organisation and that ideally it should be based back in Hildesheim near the operational deployment area. In April 1991, two troops were merged, forming 73 (Sphinx) Special OP Battery RA.

Recent deployments
The battery deployed on Operation Herrick 7 where two personnel serving with the battery were killed in separate mine strike incidents, as well as three seriously injured. During the tour the battery mounted the longest uninterrupted long-range desert patrol since World War II, living off their WMIK vehicles for seven weeks without any operational pause.

See also
148 (Meiktila) Battery Royal Artillery
Brigade Patrol Troop
Pathfinder Platoon
Stay-behind

References

External links

 British Army Website
 SOLDIER Magazine Mar 2014 - In Hostile Territory (p32-35)
 Elite Forces

Royal Artillery batteries
Organisations based in North Yorkshire
Military units and formations established in 1982
1982 establishments in the United Kingdom
Army reconnaissance units and formations